The 2nd Women's Boat Race took place on 16 March 1929. The contest was between crews from the Universities of Oxford and Cambridge and held on the River Thames along a half-mile course.

Background
The first Women's Boat Race was conducted on The Isis in 1927.  No race was held in 1928.

Crews
Cambridge were represented by Newnham while Oxford saw a mix of St Hilda's and Oxford Home-Students.

Race
The crews were forbidden from racing side-by-side, so Cambridge rowed the  course first, followed by Oxford.  The contest was won by Cambridge in a time of 3 minutes 32.4 seconds, beating Oxford by 0.4 seconds.  The victory took the overall record in the competition to 1–1.

See also
The Boat Race 1929

References

External links
 Official website

Women's Boat Race
1929 in English sport
March 1929 sports events
Boat
Boat
1929 sports events in London